Christina Jean "Chris" Innis is an American film editor and filmmaker. She was awarded the 2010 Academy Award, BAFTA, and ACE awards for "Best Film Editing" on the film The Hurt Locker shared with co-editor, Bob Murawski. She is an elected member of the American Cinema Editors (ACE) and has served as an associate director on the board.

Early life
Innis was born and raised in San Diego, California, the daughter of architect Donald Innis and his wife, teacher and floral designer Virginia.

Chris Innis moved to the San Francisco Bay Area where she graduated from U.C. Berkeley, majoring in film studies. While a student at Cal Berkeley, Innis interned for several San Francisco production companies, including the commercial company owned and operated by cinematographer Ron Eveslage.

Career highlights
Innis completed post-graduate film studies at The California Institute of the Arts and received a MFA degree in filmmaking. During this time, Innis edited music videos featuring rappers Ice Cube, Onyx and DMX, as well as edited the first music video for the band Fine Industrial is Dead directed by Jordan Scott (daughter of notable film director Ridley Scott). Innis also directed and/or produced almost two dozen karaoke videos of hits for Japanese firm Pioneer Electronics.

After a move to Hollywood, Innis worked as the production coordinator on the first season of the long-running hit television series American's Funniest Home Videos. She later worked her way up in post-production alongside film editor, Pietro Scalia, who she assisted on the Academy Award-winning Oliver Stone film JFK. Innis and Scalia worked for six years together on a variety of films including Ridley Scott's G.I. Jane, Sam Raimi's The Quick and the Dead, White Man's Burden starring John Travolta, and Sam Raimi's cult horror TV pilot American Gothic.

Innis progressed as a music editor and film editor for Sam Raimi (film director best known for The Evil Dead and the successful original Spider-Man films). Innis was hired by Raimi for the job of lead editor on the CBS/Universal TV horror series American Gothic. Innis has since edited several films including 2010's Best Picture winner The Hurt Locker, which won six Academy Awards including best editing.

Innis has worked as a producer, writer, and editor with Bob Murawski for the distribution of cult films for Grindhouse Releasing and Box Office Spectaculars. She has also worked on the digital restorations of The Big Gundown and The Swimmer. She wrote, produced, directed and edited a -hour, five-part documentary The Story of the Swimmer featuring behind-the-scenes interviews with cast and crew of the 1968 film The Swimmer including Joan Rivers, Janet Landgard, Marge Champion, Burt Lancaster's daughter Joanna Lancaster, producer Michael Hertzberg and former film executive Ted Zachary (New Line Cinema). The documentary has been called "miraculous... never a dull moment", "a fascinating Hollywood story" which is "impressive...and should be in the running for Best (Blu-ray) Feature of the year".

Chris Innis appears in the documentary 78/52 directed by Alexandre O. Philippe, a post-modern breakdown of the iconic shower scene in Alfred Hitchcock's Psycho.

Personal life
Since 2008, Innis has been married to fellow film editor and film distributor Bob Murawski. The two were first introduced to one another by Sam Raimi and met while both were editing American Gothic. The couple married shortly after completing work on The Hurt Locker. Her sister is Bay Area artist Cynthia Ona Innis.

Selected filmography

Awards and nominations
The Swimmer – (Won) – The 2014 International Press Academy's Satellite Award – Outstanding Overall Blu-ray/DVD (producer /Grindhouse Releasing)
The Hurt Locker – (Won) – 2010 Academy Award – Best Film Editing
The Hurt Locker – (Won) – 2010 BAFTA – Best Film Editing
The Hurt Locker – (Won) – 2010 ACE Eddie Award – Best Film Editing
The Hurt Locker – (Won) – The Online Film Critics Society – Best Film Editing
The Hurt Locker – (Won) – The Las Vegas Film Critics Association – Best Film Editing
The Hurt Locker – (Won) –  Boston Society of Film Critics – Best Film Editing
The Hurt Locker – (Won) –  The International Press Academy's Golden Satellite Award – Best Film Editing
The Hurt Locker – (Won) – International Cinephile Society Award – Best Editing
The Hurt Locker – (Nominated) – The Broadcast Film Critics Association  Critic's Choice Awards – Best Film Editing
The Hurt Locker – (Nominated) –  Hollywood Post Alliance Awards Outstanding Editing – Feature Film

See also
List of Academy Award winning couples

References

External links

"Tech Support Interview: The Crafts of The Hurt Locker", Incontention, by Guy Lodge, January 7th, 2010
Below the Line Magazine – "Contenders – Editors Bob Murawski and Chris Innis, The Hurt Locker", by Mary Ann Skweres, March 2, 2010

Living people
American Cinema Editors
American documentary filmmakers
American film editors
Film producers from California
American women screenwriters
Best Editing BAFTA Award winners
Best Film Editing Academy Award winners
California Institute of the Arts alumni
Year of birth missing (living people)
Film directors from California
People from San Diego
UC Berkeley College of Letters and Science alumni
Screenwriters from California
American women film editors
American women documentary filmmakers
21st-century American women